Xdebug is a PHP extension which provides debugging and profiling capabilities. It uses the DBGp debugging protocol.

The debug information that Xdebug can provide includes the following:
 stack and function traces in error messages with:
full parameter display for user defined functions
function name, file name and line indications
support for member functions
 memory allocation
 protection for infinite recursions

Xdebug also provides:
 profiling information for PHP scripts
 code coverage analysis
 capabilities to debug your scripts interactively with a debugger front-end.

Xdebug is also available via the PECL.

See also

Debugger
Dynamic program analysis
Software performance analysis
Optimization
DBG (another open source PHP debugger)
Zend Studio (the Zend Debugger is an alternative to Xdebug)

References

External links

Xdebug in PECL
 Xdebug trace log visualization tool

Debuggers
PHP software
Free software programmed in C
Cross-platform free software